Françoise Vatel (born Françoise Watel, 28 November 1937 – 24 October 2005) was a French actress.

Vatel was born in Clichy, Hauts-de-Seine. She began her film career at the age of 16 in Jean Gourguet's Les Premiers outrages, and she worked with the director again in Les promesses dangeureuses, La Putain sentimentale and Les frangines. She worked then in the theatre, playing for several years in Claude Magnier's Oscar. She appeared also in films of the Nouvelle Vague, in Luc Moullet's Brigitte et Brigitte and Les Contrebandières and Claude Chabrol's Les Cousins among others. She died in Soissons, aged 67.

Selected filmography

Film
 1955 : Les Premiers Outrages by Jean Gourguet : Brigitte Lambert, known as Bichette
 1956 : Les Promesses dangereuses by Jean Gourguet : Marie-Titi
 1958 : Un jour comme les autres by Paul Bordry
 1958 : Quelqu'un frappe à la porte by Alexandre Szombati : Elisabeth
 1958 : Les Tricheurs by Marcel Carné with Christian Azzopardi
 1958 : La Putain sentimentale by Jean Gourguet with Maria Vincent
 1959 : Les Cousins by Claude Chabrol : Martine with Gerard Blain
 1959 : Bal de nuit by Maurice Cloche
 1959 : Les Amants de demain by Marcel Blistène with Édith Piaf
 1960 : Dans la gueule du loup by Jean-Charles Dudrumet
 1960 : Un steack trop cuit by Luc Moullet - short film
 1960 : Les Frangines by Jean Gourguet : Nadine
 1960 : Le Pain des Jules by Jacques Séverac : Zize
 1961 : Terres noires by Luc Moullet - short film, narration only
 1961 : Dans la gueule du loup by Jean-Charles Dudrumet, : Odette
 1962 : Les Ballets roses (Dossier 1413) d'Alfred Rode : Caroline
 1962 : Capito? by Luc Moullet - short film
 1962 : La fille de Paname et le gars de Padoue by Luc Moullet - short film
 1965 : Les Bons Vivants by Gilles Grangier : Une pensionnaire (segment "La Fermeture")
 1966 : Brigitte et Brigitte by Luc Moullet : Brigitte
 1967 : Les Contrebandières by Luc Moullet : Brigitte
 1967 : Jeudi on chantera comme dimanche by Louis by Heusch : Francine
 1972 : Le gang des otages by Edouard Molinaro
 1976 : Mon cœur est rouge by Michèle Rosier : La charcutière
 1978 : L'Exercice du pouvoir by Philippe Galland : Mimi
 1985 : Une soirée perdue by Cécile Decugis
 1986 : Les interdits du monde by Chantal Lasbats - documentary, narration only
 1987 : La Comédie du travail by Luc Moullet : Une amie by Françoise
 1988 : De bruit et de fureur by Jean-Claude Brisseau : Mère Jean-Roger
 2002 : Les Naufragés by la D17 by Luc Moullet : la femme by la cabine
 2005 : Horizon by Pascale Bodet

Television 
 1959 : La Nuit de Tom Brown (TV) : Daisy
 1960 : Au fil by l'histoire (Les Cinq Dernières Minutes) (TV series) : Georgette
 1961 : Epreuves à l'appui (Les Cinq Dernières Minutes, episode 21), by Claude Loursais : Janine
 1962 : Quatre-vingt-treize by Alain Boudet, (TV)
 1966 : Cécilia, médecin de campagne (TV series) : Marie-Rose
 1966 : Les Cinq Dernières Minutes by Claude Loursais, episode Pigeon vole
 1966 : Les Cinq Dernières Minutes by Jean-Pierre Marchand La Rose by fer
 1967 : Au théâtre ce soir : Le Système Fabrizzi by Albert Husson, story Sacha Pitoëff, director Pierre Sabbagh, Théâtre Marigny
 1969 : La Veuve rusée (by Carlo Goldoni), telefilm by Jean Bertho : Marinette
 1972 : L'Image (TV) : Le script
 1973 : L'Enfant de l'automne (feuilleton TV) : La fille
 1974 : Entre toutes les femmes by Maurice Cazeneuve : Margot
 1978 : Claudine en ménage by Édouard Molinaro
 1980 : Papa Poule by Roger Kahane, (TV series) : L'employée by l'ANPE (1980)
 1982 : Le sage de Sauvenat (TV)
 1984 : Rue Carnot (TV series) : Suzanne
 1989 :  Je retourne chez maman (Intrigues) by Emmanuel Fonlladosa

1937 births
2005 deaths
People from Clichy, Hauts-de-Seine
French television actresses
French film actresses
French stage actresses
20th-century French women